William Fotheringham (born 1965) is a sports writer specialising in cycling and rugby. As a newspaper journalist, he writes for The Guardian. Fotheringham was a features editor for Cycling Weekly, the features editor of Cycle Sport and co-founder of Procycling magazine. He is a current writer for procycling Magazine.

A graduate of Cambridge University with a degree in French, Russian and Italian, Fotheringham won the IPC Media Specialist Writer of the Year award in 1993 and 1998.

He has been a racing cyclist for nearly 40 years. He is described by Rapha as being "one of the finest writers in the ‘Pro Tour’ pressroom".

His 2012 biography of Eddy Merckx Half-Man, Half-Bike, was the first cycling title to achieve No 1 status in the Sunday Times bestseller lists.

He is the brother of fellow cycling journalist Alasdair Fotheringham.

His most recent books are Sunday in Hell, an account of how iconic director Jorgen Leth made the film of the same name about the 1976 Paris–Roubaix, and The Greatest, the Times and Life of Beryl Burton, a self-published venture.

Books by Fotheringham

As translator

References

External links
 

Living people
Cycling journalists
Cycling writers
British sportswriters
British sports journalists
Place of birth missing (living people)
1965 births